Albert Shaw (July 23, 1857 – June 25, 1947) was an American journalist and academic.

Life
Born in Shandon, Ohio, to the family of Dr. Griffin M. Shaw, Albert Shaw moved to Iowa in the spring of 1875, where he attended Iowa College (now Grinnell College) specializing in constitutional history and economic science and graduated in 1879. While a student, Shaw also worked as a journalist at the Grinnell Herald. In 1881 he entered Johns Hopkins University as a graduate student.

In 1883, Shaw secured a position on the Minneapolis Tribune but returned to Johns Hopkins to complete a Ph.D. His thesis, "Icaria: A Chapter in the History of Communism", was later translated and published in Germany. After graduation, he resumed work at the Tribune.

In 1888, Shaw took a sociological tour of Britain and the European continent. There he met British journalist and reformer William Thomas Stead, editor of the British journal Review of Reviews.

In the autumn of 1890 Shaw was elected professor of international law and political institutions at Cornell University but resigned the post in 1891 to accept Stead's invitation to establish The American Review of Reviews as an American edition of the Review of Reviews. Shaw served as editor-in-chief of this publication until it ceased publication in 1937, ten years before his death at the age of ninety.

Shaw married Elizabeth Leonard Bacon of Reading, Pennsylvania, on September 5, 1893.

Shaw was elected a member of the American Antiquarian Society in October 1893.

Selected works

Notes

References

New General Catalog of Old Books and Authors

External links
 
 
 
 

American male journalists
Johns Hopkins University alumni
1857 births
1947 deaths
Grinnell College alumni
Members of the American Antiquarian Society
People from Butler County, Ohio